Vernon Wild (born 9 August 1939) is a South African cricketer. He played in nineteen first-class matches for Border from 1962/63 to 1967/68.

See also
 List of Border representative cricketers

References

External links
 

1939 births
Living people
South African cricketers
Border cricketers
Cricketers from East London, Eastern Cape